Once Over Nightly is a sex comedy play. It ran for over two years in San Francisco.

Plot
A public relations man finds his picture in the newspaper with a curvaceous model wearing only his account's product.

References

American plays